Cophomantella myadelpha is a moth in the family Lecithoceridae. It was described by Edward Meyrick in 1910. It is known from Assam, India and southern India.

The wingspan is 15–19 mm. The forewings are light shining bronzy brown. The stigmata are large, cloudy and rather dark purple fuscous, the plical somewhat before the first discal. The hindwings are grey.

References

Moths described in 1910
Cophomantella
Taxa named by Edward Meyrick